Ali-Asghar Bahari (b. 1905 – d. June 10, 1995) was an Iranian musician and kamancheh player.

He was born in Tehran from Baharian parents and started his music lessons under his grandfather Mohammad Taghi Khan, who was a kamancheh player as well.

He started his own music school in Mashhad, then moved back to Tehran and became a kamancheh instructor in Honarestan under Ruhollah Khaleghi. He toured France, Belgium, Germany, Italy, England and the United States. He died in Tehran on June 10, 1995.

There is a photo of Bahari at this site; he is in the center of the photo.

References

Haghighat, A., Honarmandan e Irani az Aghaz ta Emrooz, Koomesh Publication, 2004, (in Persian)
Ali Asghar Bahari on Iran Chamber Society

External links
 

1905 births
1995 deaths
Iranian kamancheh players
People from Hamadan Province
Burials at Emamzadeh Taher
Musicians from Tehran
20th-century Iranian people